Gilles Lurton (born on 6 July 1963)
is a French politician. He has represented Ille-et-Vilaine's 7th constituency since 2012, first as a member of the Union for a Popular Movement and then the Republicans.

Biography
His first political office came when he was elected to the municipal council of Saint-Malo in 1995. Following the 2008 elections, he was appointed deputy mayor of Saint-Malo (in charge of housing and neighborhoods).

He became general councilor of Ille-et-Vilaine in 2011 taking the canton of Saint-Malo-Sud, succeeding Jacky Le Menn who did not stand for re-election.

In 2012, he stood for Ille-et-Vilaine's 7th constituency. He came second in the first round of the election with 21% of the vote, then in
the second round, defeated the socialist Isabelle Thomas with 51% of the vote. He sits on the Social Affairs Committee of the National Assembly. Due to the rule of non-cumulation of mandates, he gave up  his mandate as general councilor of Ille-et-Vilaine. His substitute Christine Lequertier succeeded him in July 2012.

The list led by René Couanau placing only 3rd in the second round of the municipal elections of March 2014, he then lost his post as deputy mayor and sat as a simple municipal councilor.

He supported Bruno Le Maire in the 2016 presidential primary for the Republicans. In September 2016, he was appointed, with several others, member of the political committee of the campaign.

References

External links
 His page on the site of the National Assembly

Deputies of the 14th National Assembly of the French Fifth Republic
Deputies of the 15th National Assembly of the French Fifth Republic
Living people
1963 births
People from Ille-et-Vilaine
Mayors of places in Brittany
The Republicans (France) politicians
Members of Parliament for Ille-et-Vilaine